One More Drifter in the Snow is the sixth album and first Christmas album by Aimee Mann, released by SuperEgo Records in the United States on October 31, 2006 (see 2006 in music). It was produced by Paul Bryan and comprises covers of "standard great Christmas classics" and two original compositions: "Christmastime", written by Mann's husband Michael Penn, and "Calling on Mary". Grant-Lee Phillips sings with her on the track "You're a Mean One, Mr. Grinch".

Mann has cited the influence of Johnny Mathis' album Merry Christmas (1958) on One More Drifter in the Snow, deciding to "go the Mel Tormé, Dean Martin, Frank Sinatra, lounge-y, sort of Julie London record" rather than make an album in the style of "the groovy modern Christmas records". Another inspiration for the album was the Vince Guaraldi Trio's soundtrack for the 1965 film A Charlie Brown Christmas (see A Charlie Brown Christmas soundtrack), which Mann said "has a lot of dark and mysterious undertones. First, Charlie Brown is depressed by the commercialism of Christmas and then there's Linus, who steps out to tell the story of the nativity, with this heartbreakingly moral stance. We wanted our take to be all that – mysterious, quiet, moody. And classy." According to Mann, "it didn't take any time to [get] into the Christmas vibe" when she began recording the album in May 2006. "Before it got really hot, it was just so nice to be in the mood, without the pressures of buying presents and stuff."

As of December 2008, the album has sold 39,000 copies in United States.

Track listing
"Whatever Happened to Christmas?" (Jimmy Webb)
"The Christmas Song" (Mel Tormé, Bob Wells)
"Christmastime" (Michael Penn)
"I'll Be Home for Christmas" (Walter Kent)
"You're a Mean One, Mr. Grinch" (Theodor Geisel, Albert Hague)
"Winter Wonderland" (Felix Bernard, Richard B. Smith)
"Have Yourself a Merry Little Christmas" (Hugh Martin, Ralph Blane)
"God Rest Ye Merry Gentlemen" (Traditional)
"White Christmas" (Irving Berlin)
"Calling on Mary" (Aimee Mann, Paul Bryan)
"River" (Joni Mitchell) - bonus track on UK re-issue (released November 10, 2008)

Personnel
Aimee Mann – vocals, guitar
Jay Bellerose – percussion
Paul Bryan – bass guitar
Ryan Freeland – recording engineer
Duke Levine – guitar
Patrick Warren – keyboards
Grant-Lee Phillips – vocals

References

Hasty, Kate. "Mann Gets In The Holiday Spirit For New Album". Billboard. August 9, 2006. Retrieved October 14, 2006.

Aimee Mann albums
2006 Christmas albums
Christmas albums by American artists
Albums produced by Paul Bryan (musician)
SuperEgo Records albums
Rock Christmas albums